Enrique Sánchez-Guijo is a paralympic athlete from Spain competing mainly in category T11 sprint events.

Sánchez has competed in three Paralympics, firstly in 1992 Summer Paralympics in his home country whereas in well as competing in the 200m, 400m and 800m he was a part of the victorious 4 × 400 m relay team.  At the following games in 1996 he again competed in the 100m, 200m and 400m, but it was as part of the Spanish relay teams that he won medals, gold in the 4 × 100 m and 4 × 400 m.  It was in 2000 Summer Paralympics that he won his first individual medal, a gold medal in the T11 200m while he also ran as part of the bronze medal-winning 4 × 100 m relay team.

References

Paralympic athletes of Spain
Athletes (track and field) at the 1992 Summer Paralympics
Athletes (track and field) at the 1996 Summer Paralympics
Athletes (track and field) at the 2000 Summer Paralympics
Paralympic gold medalists for Spain
Paralympic bronze medalists for Spain
Spanish male sprinters
Living people
Medalists at the 1992 Summer Paralympics
Medalists at the 1996 Summer Paralympics
Medalists at the 2000 Summer Paralympics
Year of birth missing (living people)
Paralympic medalists in athletics (track and field)
Visually impaired sprinters
Paralympic sprinters